Margaret Bell (born 23 February 1945) is a British gymnast. She competed in five events at the 1968 Summer Olympics.

References

1945 births
Living people
British female artistic gymnasts
Olympic gymnasts of Great Britain
Gymnasts at the 1968 Summer Olympics
People from Beckenham